Spring Valley may refer to:

Places
In Canada
Spring Valley, Ontario
Spring Valley, Prince Edward Island
Spring Valley, Saskatchewan

In Kenya
Spring Valley, Nairobi

In the United States

Spring Valley, Arizona
Spring Valley, San Diego County, California
Spring Valley, El Dorado County, California
Spring Valley, Lake County, California
Valley Springs, California, formerly Spring Valley
Spring Valley, Illinois
Spring Valley, Kentucky
Spring Valley, Minnesota
Spring Valley, Nevada, in Clark County
Spring Valley (White Pine County, Nevada), a valley in northeastern Nevada
Spring Valley Wind Farm, built in the valley in 2012
Spring Valley, New Jersey
Spring Valley, New York
Spring Valley, Ohio
Spring Valley (Oregon)
Spring Valley Historic District, Pennsylvania
Spring Valley Rural Historic District, Virginia
Spring Valley, Manitowoc County, Wisconsin, an unincorporated community
Spring Valley, Wisconsin, a village in Pierce and St. Croix counties
Spring Valley (town), Wisconsin, in Rock County
Spring Valley Village, Texas
Spring Valley (Washington, D.C.)

Other
Spring Valley (Yoplait)
Spring Valley High School (South Carolina)